Now run by Kathryn McDowell (as of 2021), The Shreveport Metropolitan Ballet (SMB) was founded in 1973 as the Ballet Lyrique in the Shreveport-Bossier City area. SMB has been operating continuously since then, making it one of the oldest arts organizations in Shreveport.

Each year "Fall for Dance!" is performed in conjunction with other local dance groups. SMB annually presents two full-length classical ballets, including the holiday ballet The Nutcracker and a performance each spring of other ballets from the classical repertoire. The audiences come not only from the Shreveport-Bossier City areas, but also from East Texas, southern Arkansas, and small communities throughout north Louisiana.

Dancers from ages ten to adult are chosen each spring by open auditions to become members of the Junior, Senior Apprentice, and Senior companies of the Ballet. The existence of the Ballet has provided these dancers with the necessary training and experience to go on to dance with companies in other cities and to study dance at the university level. Dancers gain valuable experience by being able to dance alongside the professional guest artists brought in each year for the performances. Guest artists have come from such ballets as the New York City Ballet, the Boston Ballet, the Houston Ballet, Oklahoma City Ballet, and the San Francisco Ballet.

External links
Official Site of Shreveport Metro Ballet

Culture of Shreveport, Louisiana
Ballet companies in the United States
Dance in Louisiana
Non-profit organizations based in Louisiana